Free Crack is the debut mixtape of American rapper Lil Bibby and was released on November 29, 2013.

Background
Lil Bibby cited that Drake and Jadakiss as two of his favorite rappers. Vice stated that the debut mixtape had clear influences from both rappers.

The mixtape features guest appearances from Lil Herb and King L, among others. The production was handled by DJ L, Hit-Boy, Black Metaphor, Young Chop and The Olympicks, among others.

Singles 
Free Crack was supported by three singles, "How We Move" and "Stressin" are both singles only were released in 2013, whilst "Tired of Talkin" was released in 2014.

There have been released 4 music videos of the mixtape; "How We Move" featuring King L, "Change", "Water" and "Tired of Talkin'".

Critical reception
BET called the mixtape "a solid rookie effort from someone that's got skills, credibility and heart", noting that "Combining a gruff and imposing voice with crushing delivery and flows that oscillate from Down South slow to Midwest speedy (though not quite Twista fast), Bibby is one of the hottest new artists to come out of the Midwest in a minute."

Following the release of the debut mixtape, Bibby was featured in Vibe, which stated that he was one of the rappers to watch in 2014. The article complimented Bibby, stating that he had what it takes to be a major music artist, due to his maturity and his rapping ability.

Track list

References

2014 mixtape albums
Lil Bibby albums
Albums produced by Honorable C.N.O.T.E.
Albums produced by Young Chop
Albums produced by Hit-Boy